Carl-Wilhelm Engdahl (16 July 1926 – 13 October 2012) was a Swedish fencer. He competed in the team épée events at the 1960 and 1964 Summer Olympics.

References

External links
 

1926 births
2012 deaths
Swedish male épée fencers
Olympic fencers of Sweden
Fencers at the 1960 Summer Olympics
Fencers at the 1964 Summer Olympics
People from Växjö
Sportspeople from Kronoberg County